Vahan Bichakhchyan (born 9 July 1999) is an Armenian professional footballer who plays as an attacking midfielder for Ekstraklasa side Pogoń Szczecin and the Armenia national team. He's the son of Vardan Bichakhchyan, Ararat Yerevan's current coach.

Club career

MŠK Žilina
In July 2017, Bichakhchyan signed a five-year contract with Žilina. He made his Fortuna Liga debut for Žilina in a 6–0 defeat against Slovan Bratislava on 24 February 2018, replacing Miroslav Káčer eight minutes before the end of the game.

Pogoń Szczecin
In January 2022, Pogoń Szczecin announced that they reached an agreement with MŠK Žilina for the permanent transfer of Bichakhchyan. He signed a 3.5-year contract for a fee €900.000.

Career statistics

Scores and results list Armenia's goal tally first, score column indicates score after each Bichakhchyan goal.

Honours
In December 2020, Armenian Football Federation Bichakhchyan polled as Armenia's third best player of the year, behind national team captain and Roma  star Henrikh Mkhitaryan and Astana midfielder Tigran Barseghyan.

References

External links

MŠK Žilina official club profile

Futbalnet profile

1999 births
Living people
Armenian footballers
Footballers from Gyumri
Association football midfielders
Armenia international footballers
Armenia under-21 international footballers
Armenia youth international footballers
Armenian Premier League players
Slovak Super Liga players
Ekstraklasa players
III liga players
FC Shirak players
MŠK Žilina players
Pogoń Szczecin players
Armenian expatriate footballers
Expatriate footballers in Slovakia
Armenian expatriate sportspeople in Slovakia
Expatriate footballers in Poland
Armenian expatriate sportspeople in Poland